Over and Over is the debut extended play by South Korean singer Kim Ji-yeon (also known as Kei). It was released on October 8, 2019 by Woollim Entertainment and distributed by Kakao M. The EP contains six tracks, including the lead single "I Go".

Background and release

On September 27, 2019, Woollim Entertainment announced Kei would make her solo debut with the extended play "Over and Over", under her real name Kim Ji-yeon. The album and the lead single "I Go" music video were released on October 8.

Composition
The lead single "I Go" was composed by Junzo and TAK and written by Junzo and ARRAN. It is a song with "a beautiful piano melody and hopeful sounds of string instruments."

Track listing

References

2019 debut EPs
Woollim Entertainment EPs
Korean-language EPs
Kakao M EPs